Curtis Millender (born December 1, 1987) is an American mixed martial artist who competes in the Middleweight division. A professional competitor since 2013, Millender has formerly competed in Ultimate Fighting Championship (UFC), Bellator MMA, Professional Fighters League (PFL), and Legacy Fighting Alliance (LFA).

Mixed martial arts career

Early career
Millender began his professional MMA career in February 2013. During this period of his career, Millender competed exclusively for the California-based promotion, Fight Club OC. He compiled a perfect record of 7–0 in the organization, which included a three-round split decision victory over 10-6 Dominic Waters to become the FCOC welterweight champion.

Bellator MMA
Millender was expected to make his promotional debut against Michael Page at Bellator 134 on February 27, 2015. However, after a cut suffered by Page, Millender instead faced Brennan Ward at the event. Millender lost the fight via rear-naked choke submission in the first round, resulting in the first professional loss of his career.

Millender next faced Fernando Gonzalez at Bellator 137 on May 15, 2015. He lost the fight via guillotine choke submission in the third round. Millender was subsequently released from the promotion following his loss to Gonzalez.

Millender returned to face Steven Ciaccio at Bellator 141 on August 28, 2015. He won the fight via unanimous decision.

Millender faced Johnny Cisneros at Bellator 170 on January 21, 2017. He won the fight via TKO in the first round due to strikes.

Ultimate Fighting Championship
On the heel of a six fight win streak, including three straight on the regional scene under the Legacy Fighting Alliance promotion, Millender signed with the UFC in January 2018.

Millender made his promotional debut against Thiago Alves on February 18, 2018 at UFC Fight Night 126. He won the fight via a technical knockout in the second round. This win earned him the Performance of the Night bonus.

Millender faced Max Griffin on July 7, 2018 at UFC 226. He won the fight via unanimous decision.

Millender faced Siyar Bahadurzada on December 29, 2018 at UFC 232. He won the fight by unanimous decision.

Millender faced Elizeu Zaleski dos Santos on March 9, 2019 at UFC Fight Night 146. He lost the fight via a submission in round one.

Millender faced Belal Muhammad on April 13, 2019 at UFC 236. He lost the fight by unanimous decision.

On November 3, 2019 it was announced that Millender had been released from the UFC.

Return to Bellator
In November 2019, Millender announced that he had signed a contract with Bellator MMA. 

In his return to the promotion, Millender faced Moses Murrietta at Bellator 238 on January 25, 2020. He won the fight by unanimous decision.

As the last fight of his prevailing contract, Millender faced Sabah Homasi at Bellator 243 on August 7, 2020. He lost the fight via unanimous decision.

Professional Fighters League
Already an alternative for the season, Millender stepped in on short notice and replaced David Michaud for the whole PFL 2021 season. He faced Rory MacDonald on April 29, 2021 at PFL 2 as the start of the 2021 PFL Welterweight tournament. He lost the bout in the first round via a rear-naked choke submission.

Millender faced Magomed Magomedkerimov at PFL 5 on June 17, 2021. He lost the bout via ezekiel choke submission in the first round.

Millender, as a replacement for Sadibou Sy, was scheduled to face Gleison Tibau on August 13, 2021 at PFL 7. On August 12, Millender was announced to have pulled out of the bout against Tibau.

XMMA 
Millender faced Jared Gooden on April 2, 2022 at XMMA 4. He lost the bout after getting dropped in the second round from a leg kick and getting finished by ground and pound.

Millender faced KB Bhullar on September 23, 2022 at Unified MMA 46. The bout ended in a no contest after an eye poke left Millender unable to continue.

Millender faced Salaiman Ahmadyar for the UNF Middleweight Championship on January 28, 2023 at UNF 4, winning the bout via TKO stoppage at the end of the first round.

Personal life
Millender has two sons: Curtis Jr. and Carter. Millender is currently married to his long time girlfriend Ashley Richie now Ashley Millender. The two were married June 23, 2019. July 2020 they welcomed another baby boy Cross.

Championships and accomplishments

Mixed martial arts
Ultimate Fighting Championship
Performance of the Night (One time) vs. Thiago Alves
Fight Club OC
FCOC Welterweight Championship (Two times)
One successful title defense
Lights Out Promotion
Lights Out Welterweight Championship (One time)

Mixed martial arts record

|-
|Win
|align=center| 19-9 (1)
|Salaiman Ahmadyar
| TKO (punches)
|UNF 4
|
|align=center| 1
|align=center| 4:55
|Commerce, California, United States
|
|-
|NC
|align=center|18–9 (1)
|KB Bhullar
|No Contest (accidental eye poke)
|Unified MMA 46
|
|align=center|1
|align=center|1:34
|Enoch, Alberta, Canada
|
|-
|Loss
|align=center|18–9
|Jared Gooden
|TKO (leg kick and punches)
|XMMA 4: Black Magic
|
|align=center|2
|align=center|0:16
|New Orleans, Louisiana, United States
|
|-
|Loss
|align=center|18–8
|Magomed Magomedkerimov	
|Submission (ezekiel choke)
|PFL 5 
|
|align=center|1
|align=center|1:57
|Atlantic City, New Jersey, United States
|
|-
|Loss
|align=center|18–7
|Rory MacDonald
| Submission (rear-naked choke)
| PFL 2
| 
| align=center| 1
| align=center| 3:38
| Atlantic City, New Jersey, United States
|
|-
|Loss
|align=center|18–6
|Sabah Homasi
|Decision (unanimous)
|Bellator 243
|
|align=center|3
|align=center|5:00
|Uncasville, Connecticut, United States
|
|-
|Win
|align=center|18–5
|Moses Murrietta
|Decision (unanimous)
|Bellator 238
|
|align=center|3
|align=center|5:00
|Inglewood, California, United States
|
|-
|Loss
|align=center|17–5
|Belal Muhammad
|Decision (unanimous)
|UFC 236 
|
|align=center|3
|align=center|5:00
|Atlanta, Georgia, United States
|
|-
|Loss
|align=center|17–4
|Elizeu Zaleski dos Santos
||Submission (rear-naked choke)
|UFC Fight Night: Lewis vs. dos Santos 
|
|align=center|1
|align=center|2:35
|Wichita, Kansas, United States
|
|-
|Win
|align=center|17–3
|Siyar Bahadurzada
||Decision (unanimous)
|UFC 232 
|
|align=center|3
|align=center|5:00
|Inglewood, California, United States
|  
|-
|Win
|align=center|16–3
|Max Griffin
|Decision (unanimous)
|UFC 226 
|
|align=center|3
|align=center|5:00
|Las Vegas, Nevada, United States
|
|-
|Win
|align=center|15–3
|Thiago Alves
|KO (knee)
|UFC Fight Night: Cowboy vs. Medeiros 
|
|align=center|2
|align=center|4:17
|Austin, Texas, United States
|
|-
|Win
|align=center|14–3
|Nick Barnes
|KO (head kick)
|LFA 30
|
|align=center|2
|align=center|2:51
|Costa Mesa, California, United States
|
|-
|Win
|align=center|13–3
|Matthew Frincu
|KO (head kick)
|LFA 24
|
|align=center|1
|align=center|0:38
|Phoenix, Arizona, United States
|
|-
|Win
|align=center|12–3
|Kevin Holland
|Decision (unanimous)
|LFA 13
|
|align=center|3
|align=center|5:00
|Burbank, California, United States
|
|-
|Win
|align=center|11–3
|Johnny Cisneros
|TKO (punches)
|Bellator 170
|
|align=center|2
|align=center|3:48
|Inglewood, California, United States
|
|-
|Win
|align=center|10–3
|Ozzie Alvarez
|Decision (unanimous)
|Fight Club OC 42
|
|align=center|5
|align=center|5:00
|Costa Mesa, California, United States
|
|-
|Win
|align=center|9–3
|Casey Greene
|Decision (unanimous)
|CXF 3
|
|align=center|5
|align=center|5:00
|Studio City, Los Angeles, California, United States
|
|-
|Loss
|align=center|8–3
|Eddie Mendez
|Decision (unanimous)
|Lights Out @ Sportsmen's Lodge: Fight Night 4 
|
|align=center|3
|align=center|5:00
|Studio City, Los Angeles, California, United States
|
|-
|Win
|align=center|8–2
|Steven Ciaccio
|Decision (unanimous)
|Bellator 141
|
|align=center|3
|align=center|5:00
|Temecula, California, United States
|
|-
|Loss
|align=center|7–2
|Fernando Gonzalez
|Submission (guillotine choke)
|Bellator 137
|
|align=center|3
|align=center|1:14
|Temecula, California, United States
|
|-
|Loss
|align=center|7–1
|Brennan Ward
|Submission (rear-naked choke)
|Bellator 134
|
|align=center|1
|align=center|1:37
|Uncasville, Connecticut, United States
|
|-
|Win
|align=center|7–0
|James Chaney
|TKO (doctor stoppage)
|Fight Club OC 32
|
|align=center|1
|align=center|0:48
|Costa Mesa, California, United States
|
|-
|Win
|align=center|6–0
|Dominic Waters
|Decision (split)
|Fight Club OC 30
|
|align=center|3
|align=center|5:00
|Costa Mesa, California, United States
|
|-
|Win
|align=center|5–0
|John Mercurio
|Decision (unanimous)
|Fight Club OC 28
|
|align=center|3
|align=center|5:00
|Costa Mesa, California, United States
|
|-
|Win
|align=center|4–0
|Alex Suhonosov
|Decision (unanimous)
|Fight Club OC 27
|
|align=center|3
|align=center|5:00
|Costa Mesa, California, United States
|
|-
|Win
|align=center|3–0
|J.C. Llamas
|Decision (unanimous)
|Fight Club OC 25
|
|align=center|3
|align=center|3:00
|Costa Mesa, California, United States
|
|-
|Win
|align=center|2–0
|Blake Belshe
|KO (punch)
|Fight Club OC
|
|align=center|1
|align=center|0:34
|Costa Mesa, California, United States
|
|-
|Win
|align=center|1–0
|Paul Gemmati
|Decision (unanimous)
|Fight Club OC
|
|align=center|3
|align=center|5:00
|Costa Mesa, California, United States
|
|-

See also
 List of male mixed martial artists

References

External links
 Curtis Millender at PFL
 
 

1987 births
Living people
American male mixed martial artists
Welterweight mixed martial artists
Mixed martial artists utilizing Brazilian jiu-jitsu
Mixed martial artists from California
Sportspeople from Anaheim, California
Ultimate Fighting Championship male fighters
American practitioners of Brazilian jiu-jitsu